Lampkin is an English surname.

Notable persons with this surname 
 Arthur Lampkin (born circa 1938), English former professional motorcycle racer
 Charles Lampkin (1913–1989), American actor, musician and lecturer
 Chrissy Lampkin, participant of an American reality television series Love & Hip Hop
 Daisy Elizabeth Adams Lampkin (1883–1965), American suffragette
 Dougie Lampkin (born 1976), English motorcycle trials rider
 Jeff Lampkin (born 1959), American former professional boxer
 Kevin Lampkin (born 1972), English former professional footballer
 Martin Lampkin (born 1950), English former professional motorcycle competitor
 Nahru Lampkin (born 1962), American entertainer, musician, street performer, entrepreneur
 Ray Lampkin (born 1948), American former professional boxer
 Sheilla Lampkin (1945–2016), American politician
 Tom Lampkin (born 1964), American former catcher in Major League Baseball
 Calvin Lampkin (1969-2001),
American former professional boxer

Others 
 Romo Lampkin, a fictional character in the television remake of Battlestar Galactica

See also 
 Lumpkin (disambiguation)

References 

English-language surnames
Surnames of English origin